To be included in this list, the person must have a Wikipedia article showing they are Italian American politician or must have references showing they are of Italian descent and are notable.

Arizona

Dennis DeConcini
Joe Arpaio, Sheriff of Maricopa County
Rick Renzi
Janet Napolitano, former governor of Arizona, former Secretary of Homeland Security

California

Joseph Alioto
Sonny Bono
Vic Fazio
Doug LaMalfa (b. 1960) 
Kevin McCarthy 
George Moscone
George Miller
Leon Panetta, (b. 1938), former White House Chief of Staff to Bill Clinton
Jimmy Panetta, (b. 1969), 
Mike Gatto, state assemblyman
Christine Pelosi
Nancy Pelosi
James Rogan
Angelo Rossi
Mike Thompson

Colorado

Diana DeGette
Kirstjen Nielsen
Steve O'Dorisio
Angie Paccione
Dana Perino, White House Press Secretary
Tom Tancredo

Connecticut

Rosa DeLauro
John DeStefano, Jr.
Michael Fedele
Ella T. Grasso

Delaware

Caesar Rodney

Florida
Dan Mica
John Mica
Dave Weldon
John J. Considine
Ron DeSantis
Darren Soto
Anthony Sabatini

Illinois

Jerry Costello
Donald A. Manzullo
Frank Olivo
Charles Panici
Martin Russo

Kansas
Mike Pompeo, United States Secretary of State

Kentucky

Romano L. Mazzoli, former congressman from Louisville
Daniel Mongiardo, Lieutenant Governor

Louisiana
Mary Landrieu, Senator
Steve Scalise, United States representative
Victor H. Schiro

Maine
John Baldacci

Maryland

Thomas L. J. D'Alesandro, Jr.
Connie Morella
William Paca

Massachusetts
Mike Capuano
Paul Cellucci
John Cogliano
Silvio O. Conte
Foster Furcolo 
John F. Kelly
Clementina Langone
Frederick C. Langone 
Michael LoPresti Jr.
Joe Malone
Thomas Menino
Joe Moakley
Richard Tisei
John A. Volpe

Michigan
Kerry Bentivolio - U.S. Representative. 
 George Anthony Dondero - U.S. Representative. 
Robert A. Ficano

Minnesota

Jim Oberstar
Bruce Vento

Mississippi
Travis Childers
Thad Cochran
Andrew H. Longino
Steven Palazzo
Chip Pickering

Montana
Greg Gianforte

Nevada
 Mark Amodei
 Kathy Augustine
 John Ensign
Adam Laxalt
Joe Lombardo
Catherine Cortez Masto

New Hampshire
Lou D'Allesandro
Kathleen Sgambati

New Jersey

Hugh Joseph Addonizio
Joseph Azzolina
Basil B. Bruno
Anthony Bucco
Dominic A. Cavicchia 
Jack Ciattarelli
Jon Corzine
Chris Christie
Marion Crecco
Donald Cresitello
Anthony R. Cucci
Donald DiFrancesco
Mike Ferguson
James Florio
Buddy Fortunato
Garry Furnari
S. Thomas Gagliano
Thomas Gangemi
John Girgenti
Frank Joseph Guarini
Anthony Imperiale
Frank LoBiondo
Joseph J. Maraziti
Joseph P. Merlino
Carmen A. Orechio
Frank Pallone
Bill Pascrell, Jr.
Joseph Pennacchio
Peter Rodino
Marge Roukema
Anthony Russo
Joseph Suliga
Robert Torricelli
Ralph A. Villani

New Mexico
 Joseph Carraro
Pete Domenici

New York
Joseph P. Addabbo
Al D'Amato
Luigi Antonini
Rob Astorino
Joe Borelli
Ann Marie Buerkle
Joseph A. Califano, Jr.
Bruce F. Caputo
George A. Cincotta
Maria Cino
Andrew Cuomo
Mario Cuomo
Carmine DeSapio (1908–2004) the last head of the Tammany Hall political machine that was active in New York politics for 150 years, and dominated them for 80 years
Thomas DiNapoli
Joseph J. DioGuardi
Geraldine Ferraro
Vito Fossella
Dan Frisa
Anthony Gaeta
Andrew Garbarino
James F. Gennaro
Eric Gioia
Rudolph Giuliani
Tom Golisano
Michael Grimm
Felix Grucci
Vincent R. Impellitteri
John LaFalce
Fiorello La Guardia
Ralph J. Lamberti
Andrew Lanza
Rick Lazio
Sebastian Leone
Michael LiPetri
Vito Lopez 
Dan Maffei
Anthony Masiello
Vito Marcantonio
Guy Molinari
Susan Molinari
Carl Paladino
Phil Palmesano
George Pataki
Ferdinand Pecora
Charles Poletti
Tom Sanzillo
Diane Savino
Anthony Scaramucci
Curtis Sliwa
Al Smith
Francis Barretto Spinola
Thomas Suozzi U.S. Representative from New York's 3rd congressional district
Peter Vallone, Sr.
Italo Zanzi

North Carolina
Virginia Foxx

Ohio
Capri Cafaro
Anthony Celebrezze
Anthony J. Celebrezze Jr.
Richard Celeste
Michael DiSalle (1908 - 1981) served as the 60th Governor of Ohio
Jim Renacci
Tim Ryan
Pat Tiberi
James Traficant
Brad Wenstrup

Oregon

Peter DeFazio
Suzanne Bonamici

Pennsylvania

Lou Barletta, U.S. Congressman, former mayor of Hazleton
Robert A. Brady, U.S. congressman
Frank Carlucci, U.S. Secretary of Defense, chairman emeritus of the Carlyle Group.
Michael F. Doyle, congressman (Italian mother, maiden name Fusco)
Larry Farnese, attorney and state senator
Vincent Fumo, former state senator, former Democratic State Senate Appropriations Chairman
Melissa Hart, former U.S. congresswoman (Italian mother, Albina Simone)
Frank Mascara, former U.S. congressman
Doug Mastriano, State Senator
Tom Marino, U.S. Congressman
Robert J. Mellow, state senator, Minority Leader (Italian mother, maiden name Generotti)
John Murtha U.S. congressman  (deceased)
Russell M. Nigro, retired State Supreme Court justice
Jeffrey Piccola, state senator, chair of State Government Committee
Frank Rizzo, former mayor of Philadelphia
Rick Saccone, former state representative
Rick Santorum, former U.S. Senator
Louis J. Tullio, former mayor of Erie
Michael Eakin, former PA Supreme Court Justice (Italian mother)

Rhode Island

Gina Raimondo
Gregg Amore
Dennis Algiere
Samuel Azzinaro
Dennis Canario
David Caprio
Frank T. Caprio
Donald Carcieri
Vincent Cianci, Jr
Frank Ciccone
David Cicilline
Arthur Corvese
Gregory Costantino
Daniel Da Ponte
John DeSimone
Christopher Del Sesto
Louis DiPalma
Edward D. DiPrete
Deborah Fellela
Frank Ferri
Antonio Giarrusso
Frank Lombardi
John J. Lombardi
Frank Lombardo
Michael Marcello
Michael Napolitano
Philip Noel
John Notte
Christopher Ottiano
Peter Palumbo
John Orlando Pastore
Dominick J. Ruggerio
Deborah Ruggiero
William San Bento
Teresa Tanzi
Stephen Ucci

Texas

Nick Lampson
Aldo Tatangelo
Giovanni Capriglione
Ted Cruz
Matt Rinaldi

Vermont

Patrick Leahy

Washington

Nick Licata
Mike Pellicciotti
Albert Rosellini
Dino Rossi

West Virginia
Joe Manchin

Wyoming
John Barrasso
Teno Roncalio
Tom Sansonetti

See also
List of Italian Americans

References

Politicians
Politicians by state
Italian-American